Jemmal is a city in the Monastir Governorate of Tunisia,  located about  south of Monastir. As of 2014 it had a population of 50,275.  The city is well known for its historic Grand Mosque and is at the centre of a region of olive groves. A festival takes place each year during the olive harvest season in November or December. It is also an important industrial center for textiles and manufacturing; the manufacturing industry employs about half of Jemmal's active population. An industrial zone was established in 2005 on 7.5 hectares (.03 sq. miles), along the road that connects Jemmal to the town of Moknine.

Notable people
Taïeb Baccouche -Minister of Education since 2011

References

External links

Populated places in Monastir Governorate
Communes of Tunisia